, (born November 15, 1961) is a former Japanese baseball player of the Hiroshima Toyo Carp and Yakult Swallows of Japan's Central League.

He was born in Aki-ku, Hiroshima, Hiroshima Prefecture.

He led his team into two Japan Series and winning one title (1984:Hiroshima and 1997:Yakult).

Career
1st play on April 7, 1984.
1st hit on April 20, 1984.
1st home run on May 6, 1984.
Rookie of the Year Award winner (1984).
Greatest number of RBI (1987).
MVP for the Month (June, 1987).
171 HR, 626 RBI, 3997 H, 34 SB.
Hiroshima Carp Batting Coach (2006-).

References

Statistics

External links
Kobayakawa Takehiko official homepage

1961 births
Living people
Baseball people from Hiroshima
Hosei University alumni
Japanese baseball players
Nippon Professional Baseball infielders
Hiroshima Toyo Carp players
Yakult Swallows players
Nippon Professional Baseball Rookie of the Year Award winners
Japanese baseball coaches
Nippon Professional Baseball coaches